Eda Wobu is an album by the Art Ensemble of Chicago recorded in Paris in 1969 and first released in 1991 by the Italian JMY label. It features performances by Lester Bowie, Joseph Jarman, Roscoe Mitchell and Malachi Favors Maghostut.

Track listing
 "Eda Wobu" (Art Ensemble of Chicago) - 48:48

Personnel
Lester Bowie – trumpet, percussion instruments
Malachi Favors Maghostut – bass, percussion instruments, vocals
Joseph Jarman – saxophones, clarinets, percussion instruments
Roscoe Mitchell – saxophones, clarinets, flute, percussion instruments

References

1969 albums
Art Ensemble of Chicago albums
JMY Records albums